I with acute (И́ и́; italics: И́ ú) is a letter of the Cyrillic script.  Its form is derived from the Cyrillic letter I (И и И и).

Usage 

Stress marks are fundamental and used in some special books like dictionaries, primers, or textbooks for foreigners, as stress is very unpredictable in all of these languages. However, in general texts, stress marks are rarely used, mainly to prevent ambiguity or to show the pronunciation of foreign words.

 and other stressed (accented) vowels is needed in these languages to change the meaning and pronunciation of the words.

Related letters and other similar characters
И и : Cyrillic letter I
Ѝ ѝ : Cyrillic letter I with grave
Й й : Cyrillic letter Short I
І і : Cyrillic letter Dotted I
Ї ї : Cyrillic letter Yi
I i : Latin letter I
Í í : Latin letter I with acute - a Czech, Faroese, Hungarian, Icelandic, and Slovak letter
Cyrillic characters in Unicode

Computing codes
Being a relatively recent letter, not present in any legacy 8-bit Cyrillic encoding, the letter И́ is not represented directly by a precomposed character in Unicode either; it has to be composed as И+◌́ (U+0301).

References

Letters with acute
Cyrillic letters with diacritics